The national rugby union teams of Scotland and Argentina (Los Pumas) have played since 1969. However, the status of the countries' first three matches—two in 1969 and one in 1973—is ambiguous, as only Argentina awarded Test caps for those encounters. The first match recognised by both sides as a Test took place in 1990.

As of November 2022, they have met 25 times, but only 22 of those matches have been recognised by both sides as Tests. Scotland went 2–1 in the three pre-1990 matches, and crushed Argentina 49–3 in their first mutually recognised Test in 1990. The Pumas then went on a seven-match winning streak, but Scotland have been more successful in recent times, winning five encounters in a row between 2014 and 2018 and winning a two-test tour in 2010.

Their most recent match took place on 19 November 2022 during a 1 Test series and was won 52–29 by Scotland, which enabled them to clinch the series 1-0.

Summary
Note: Summary below reflects test results by both teams.

Overall

Records
Note: Date shown in brackets indicates when the record was or last set.

Results

XV Results
Below is a list of matches that Argentina has awarded matches test match status by virtue of awarding caps, but Scotland did not award caps.

List of series

References

Scotland national rugby union team matches
Argentina national rugby union team matches